To counterfeit means to imitate something authentic, with the intent to steal, destroy, or replace the original, for use in illegal transactions, or otherwise to deceive individuals into believing that the fake is of equal or greater value than the real thing. Counterfeit products are fakes or unauthorized replicas of the real product. Counterfeit products are often produced with the intent to take advantage of the superior value of the imitated product. The word counterfeit frequently describes both the forgeries of currency and documents as well as the imitations of items such as clothing, handbags, shoes, pharmaceuticals, automobile parts, unapproved aircraft parts (which have caused many accidents), watches, electronics and electronic parts, software, works of art, toys, and movies.

Counterfeit products tend to have fake company logos and brands, which results in patent or trademark infringement in the case of goods. They also have a reputation for being lower quality, sometimes not working at all, and sometimes containing toxic substances such as lead. This has resulted in the deaths of hundreds of thousands of people, due to automobile and aviation accidents, poisoning, or ceasing to take essential compounds (e.g., in the case a person takes non-working medicine).

The counterfeiting of money, mostly paper money, is usually attacked aggressively by governments worldwide.

Forgery of money or government bonds

Counterfeit money is currency that is produced without the legal sanction of the state or government; this is against the law of all countries. The United States Secret Service, mostly known for its guarding-of-officials task, was initially organized primarily to combat the counterfeiting of U.S. dollars in the wake of the American Civil War. Both sides had printed counterfeit notes in attempts to destabilize the other's economy, an example of economic warfare.

Counterfeit government bonds are public debt instruments that are produced without legal sanction, with the intention of "cashing them in" for authentic currency or using them as collateral to secure loans or lines of credit through legitimate channels.

Counterfeiting of documents

Forgery is the process of making or adapting documents with the intention to deceive. It is a form of fraud, and is often a key technique in the execution of identity theft. Uttering and publishing is a term in United States law for the forgery of non-official documents, such as a trucking company's time and weight logs.

Questioned document examination is a scientific process for investigating many aspects of various documents, and is often used to examine the provenance and verity of a suspected forgery. Security printing is a printing industry specialty, focused on creating legal documents which are difficult to forge.

Counterfeit goods

The spread of counterfeit goods, including consumer goods (commonly called "knock-offs" or "rip-offs") and parts within the manufacturing supply chain, has become global in recent years and the range of goods subject to infringement has increased significantly. Apparel and accessories accounted for over 50 percent of the counterfeit goods seized by U.S. Customs and Border Control. According to the study of Counterfeiting Intelligence Bureau (CIB) of the International Chamber of Commerce (ICC), counterfeit goods make up 5 to 7% of world trade; however, these figures cannot be substantiated due to the secretive nature of the industry.

A report by the Organisation for Economic Co-operation and Development indicates that up to US$200 billion of international trade could have been in counterfeit and illegally copied goods in 2005. In November 2009, the OECD updated these estimates, concluding that the share of counterfeit and illegitimate goods in world trade had increased from 1.85% in 2000 to 1.95% in 2007. That represents an increase to US$250 billion worldwide.

In a detailed breakdown of the counterfeit goods industry, the total loss faced by countries around the world is $600 billion, with the United States facing the most economic impact.
When calculating counterfeit products, current estimates place the global losses at $400 billion. On November 29, 2010, the Department of Homeland Security seized and shut down 82 websites as part of a U.S. crackdown of websites that sell counterfeit goods, and was timed to coincide with "Cyber Monday," the start of the holiday online shopping season.

Some see the rise in counterfeiting of goods as being related to globalisation. As more and more companies, in an effort to increase profits, move manufacturing to the cheaper labour markets of the third world, areas with weaker labour laws or environmental regulations, they give the means of production to foreign workers. These new managers of production have little or no loyalty to the original corporation. They see that profits are being made by the global brand for doing little (other than advertising) and see the possibilities of removing the middle men (i.e. the parent corporation) and marketing directly to the consumer. This can result in counterfeit products being virtually indistinguishable from original products, as they are being produced in the same company, and in damage to the parent corporation due to copyright infringement.

Certain consumer goods, especially very expensive or desirable brands or those that are easy to reproduce cheaply, have become frequent and common targets of counterfeiting. The counterfeiters either attempt to deceive the consumer into thinking they are purchasing a legitimate item, or convince the consumer that they could deceive others with the imitation. An item which makes no attempt to deceive, such as a copy of a DVD with missing or different cover art or a book without a cover, is often called a "bootleg" or a "pirated copy" instead.

Counterfeiting has also been issued to "cash in" on the ever growing record collecting market. One major example is bootleggers have cloned copies of Elvis Presley's early singles for Sun Records since original copies starting changing hands amongst music fans for hundreds (and then, thousands) of dollars. Some who produce these even do so with the wrong material. For example, the song "Heartbreak Hotel" which was never released on Sun, as by the time Elvis first heard it, prior to ever recording it, he had moved from Sun to RCA Victor. Rare releases by The Beatles such as their album with the butcher cover, fan-club only released Christmas records and early demonstration discs issued by EMI are also examples of product reproduced by counterfeiters due to their high value to collectors.

Many counterfeit goods are produced and manufactured in China, making it the counterfeit capital of the world: the counterfeiting industry accounts for 8% of China's GDP. Counterfeit goods are also made in Russia, North Korea, Taiwan, Bulgaria, and Turkey. Turkey is responsible for 3.3% of word's counterfeit goods, according to OCDE. Some counterfeits are produced in the same factory that produce the original, authentic product, using inferior materials. A United States Senate Committee on Armed Services report regarding counterfeit electronic parts in the defense supply chain, highlighted in an investigation commenced in March 2011, found that 1800 cases of suspected counterfeit components were in use within over 1 million individual products". A 2012 follow-up report found that counterfeit parts came "overwhelmingly from China".

Another trend in counterfeiting, especially seen in consumer electronics, is the manufacture of entirely new products using poor quality materials or, more often, incorporating desirable features not present in a brand's authentic product line and then including prominent and fake brand names and logotypes to profit from brand recognition or brand image. An example would be imitation "Nokia" and "iPhone" cellular phones with features like dual SIM slots or analog TV, which are unavailable in authentic originals, or visually-identical clones of high-end smartphones using inferior components and the Android operating system, often with user interfaces made to resemble the devices they imitate. Another example would be imitation "iPod" MP3 players whose batteries are removable and replaceable, whereas in authentic originals the batteries are permanently installed.

In the United States, a federal crackdown on counterfeit imports is driving an increase in domestic output of fake merchandise, according to investigators and industry executives. Raids carried out in New York City resulted in the seizure of an estimated $200 million in counterfeit apparel, bearing the logos of brands such as "The North Face", "Polo", "Izod Lacoste", "Rocawear", "Seven for all Mankind", and "Fubu". One of the largest seizures was a joint operation in Arizona, Texas and California that seized seventy-seven containers of fake "Nike Air Jordan" shoes and a container of "Abercrombie & Fitch" clothing, valued at $69.5 million. Another current method of attacking counterfeits is at the retail level. Fendi sued the Sam's Club division of Walmart for selling fake "Fendi" bags and leather goods in five states. Sam's Club agreed to pay Fendi a confidential amount to settle the dispute and dismiss the action. In the case Tiffany v. eBay, Tiffany & Co. sued auction site eBay for allowing the sale of counterfeit items, but lost on all claims.

A number of companies involved in the development of anti-counterfeiting and brand protection solutions have come together to form special industry-wide and global organisations dedicated to combating the so-called "brand pirates" such as the International Hologram Manufacturers Association.  Other companies and organisations have established web-based communities that provide a framework for crowd-sourced solutions to counterfeiting. One such free community, Collectors Proof, enables manufacturers and users alike to associate unique identification numbers to virtually any item so that each new owner can update its chain of custody.  Because quality counterfeit items are often difficult to distinguish from authentic goods, this approach enables potential customers to access an item's current and previous ownersits provenanceprior to purchase.

To combat counterfeiting, companies may have the various parts of an item manufactured in independent factories and then limit the supply of certain distinguishing parts to the factory that performs the final assembly to the exact number required for the number of items to be assembled (or as near to that number as is practicable) or may require the factory to account for every part used and to return any unused, faulty or damaged parts. To help distinguish the originals from the counterfeits, the copyright holder may also employ the use of serial numbers or holograms etc., which may be attached to the product in another factory.

Counterfeit culture 

Counterfeit culture is the thriving markets surrounding fake streetwear. Most commonly, these markets originate out of areas where the inability to buy popular streetwear brands has fueled more sophisticated markets for counterfeit goods. These markets have spawned the emergence of a tribe of widely available copycat brands.

In countries like North Korea and Russia where trade sanctions were imposed in the past to prevent the importation of popular brands, demand was stimulated for available counterfeit alternatives. The economic standing of a country or region also contributed to the demand for these products as the average consumer can't afford luxury prices but will gain the same social impact purchasing a knock-off that's of almost indistinguishable quality to the original product.

Luxury streetwear is out of reach for many people, not just because of international sanctions and low wages, but because exclusivity is built into its business model. Social and cultural forces are driving the unique fashion scene. In particular, social media has a huge influence on over these markets giving people images of things they can't own and further fueling the desire to obtains certain “hyped” items by any means accessible.

Designers have even begun to acknowledge the trend of counterfeit culture by referencing fake or knock-off goods in their designs. This brought counterfeit culture into the realm of mainstream culture and has essentially shifted global acceptance towards becoming more lenient of these products as an appropriate alternative.

Anti-counterfeiting technologies 
Anti-counterfeiting technologies are added to products or their packaging to allow consumers or inspectors to check whether a product is authentic. The EUIPO Observatory on Infringements of Intellectual Property Rights has developed an anti-counterfeiting technology guide,  to address the lack of information on technology solutions available on the market and help companies improve their protection against counterfeiting. In this guide, the main anti-counterfeiting technologies currently on the market are described, and classified into five main categories:

 Electronic technologies 
 Marking technologies 
 Chemical and physical technologies
 Mechanical technologies
 Technologies for digital media 
The International Standard Organization has also published standards related to the implementation of anti-counterfeiting solutions, including ISO 12931  and ISO 22381.

See also

 Authentication
 Brand protection
 Coin counterfeiting
 Copyright infringement
 Counterfeit banknote detection pen
 Counterfeit medications
 Counterfeit watch
 Entertainment law
 Fauxbergé
 Gresham's Law
 Illegal stamps
 Intellectual property
 Legal fake
 Philatelic fakes and forgeries
 Prescription Drug Marketing Act
 Slug
 Watered stock

References

External links

 OECD/EUIPO 2019 report on counterfeiting
 Anti-counterfeit news and features at SecuringIndustry.com
 Beware of Pirates! How to Avoid Bootleg Blu-rays and DVDs article at Brenton Film
 Detecting the Truth: Fakes, Forgeries and Trickery virtual museum exhibition at Library and Archives Canada

Forgery
Commercial crimes
Counterfeit
Organized crime activity